Pietro Fabris (16 November 1934 – 2 October 2022) was an Italian politician. A member of the Christian Democracy party, the Italian People's Party, and later the United Christian Democrats, he served in the Senate of the Republic from 1987 to 1996.

Fabris died in Bassano del Grappa on 2 October 2022, at the age of 87.

References

1934 births
2022 deaths
20th-century Italian politicians
21st-century Italian politicians
Senators of Legislature X of Italy
Senators of Legislature XI of Italy
Senators of Legislature XII of Italy
Members of the Regional Council of Veneto
Mayors of places in Veneto
Christian Democracy (Italy) politicians
Italian People's Party (1994) politicians
United Christian Democrats politicians
People from Bassano del Grappa